Bangladesh women's cricket team toured Pakistan in first week of October 2015. Tour consists of a series of 2 Twenty20 Internationals and 2 One Day Internationals. It was the first time that Bangladesh women will play against other nation since 2014 Asian games. Pakistan women won all WT20I and WODI matches.

Squads

T20I series

1st T20I

2nd T20I

ODI series

1st ODI

2nd ODI

References 

2015 in women's cricket
Pakistan 2015
Bangladesh 2015
International cricket competitions in 2015–16
2015 in Bangladeshi cricket
2015 in Pakistani cricket
Bangladeshi cricket tours of Pakistan
International women's cricket competitions in Pakistan
Women's international cricket tours of Pakistan
2015 in Pakistani women's sport